Valencia is one out of 4 sectors in Universidad.

References

Universidad, San Juan, Puerto Rico
Municipality of San Juan